Greg Pollard (born 5 November 1960) is a former Australian professional squash player.

Pollard was born on 5 November 1960. He started playing squash at the Albury Squash Centre in Albury, Australia at the age of eleven before moving to Nottingham to further his career in the eighties. He was a world's top ten player and represented Australia in the 1981 & 1985 World Team Squash Championships.

References

External links
 

Australian male squash players
1960 births
Living people
20th-century Australian people
21st-century Australian people